Between December 1911 and January 1912, both Roald Amundsen (leading his South Pole expedition) and Robert Falcon Scott (leading the Terra Nova Expedition) reached the South Pole within five weeks of each other. But while Scott and his four companions died on the return journey, Amundsen's party managed to reach the geographic south pole first and subsequently return to their base camp at Framheim without loss of human life, suggesting that they were better prepared for the expedition. The contrasting fates of the two teams seeking the same prize at the same time invites comparison.

Overview 
The outcomes of the two expeditions were as follows.
Priority at the South Pole: Amundsen beat Scott to the South Pole by 34 days.
Fatalities: Scott lost five men including himself returning from the pole, out of a team of 65. Amundsen's entire team of 19 returned to Norway safely.
Some authors (including Huntford and Fiennes) associate up to two further deaths (the drowning of Robert Brissenden and the suicide of Hjalmar Johansen) with the two expeditions, but these happened outside the Antarctic Circle.

Historically, several factors have been discussed and many contributing factors claimed, including:

 Priority at the pole: Scott wrote that Amundsen's dogs seriously threatened his own polar aspirations, because dogs, being more cold-tolerant than ponies, would be able to start earlier in the season than Scott's mixed transport of dogs, ponies, and motors.
 Cherry-Garrard in The Worst Journey in the World agreed but added that in his experience, dogs would not have been able to ascend the Beardmore Glacier.
 With regards to the causes of the deaths of Scott and his companions, Cherry-Garrard devotes chapter 19 in his book to examine the causes. Among several other factors, he surmised that the rations of Scott's team were inadequate and did not provide enough energy for the men.
 Much of Scott's hauling was to be done by ponies, which are ill-suited to work on snow and ice without snow-shoes. Their relatively small hooves and large weight caused them to sink into anything other than very firm snow or ice. Oates was opposed to snow-shoes and had left most of them at base camp.
 Ponies' coats easily became soaked with perspiration during exertion, thus necessitating constant attention with blankets to avoid hypothermia through evaporation. Dogs in contrast do not have sweat glands—they cool themselves via panting, making them less vulnerable to the cold. With ponies, Scott acknowledged he could not depart until 1 November 1911 when the weather would be warmer, leaving him less time to complete the journey.
 The loss of ponies, several of which had drowned on disintegrating sea-ice, limited the supplies that could be hauled to the depots. Of 19 ponies brought south to aid in laying depots on the Ross Ice Shelf (traversed during the first and final quarters of the trek) nine were lost before the journey began. Further, unlike dogs which could eat the abundant seal and penguin meat found in Antarctica, the ponies' food had to be carried forward from the ship, vastly increasing the stores that had to be transported as Scott's expedition moved towards the pole. 
 Had the one-ton depot been placed at latitude 80° S., as planned, Scott and his two surviving companions could have reached it on their return march. Instead, because Scott refused to drive the ponies to their deaths, despite Oates' urgent advice to do so, the depot was placed some  short of there.
 The last-minute addition of Lieutenant Henry R. Bowers to the planned four-man pole party may have strained the rationing plan, although the death of Petty Officer Evans weeks later reduced the party to four again.
 The rations were deficient in B and C vitamins. The party became weaker a few weeks after reaching the pole, despite Scott's racing ambitions before the return march, writing "Now for a desperate struggle to get the news through first [before Amundsen reaches the cablehead in Australia]. I wonder if we can do it."
 The tins of cooking fuel cached along the return route were found to be partly empty, which forced the men to eat frozen food. Shortage of fuel to melt water likely caused the men to become dehydrated. Apparently the heat of the sun had vaporised part of the fuel, enabling it to escape past the cork stoppers. Amundsen knew about this "creep", and had had the fuel tins soldered shut on the voyage to Antarctica, see below.
 The weather on the return march seems to have been unusually bad. In particular, when the party reached the Great Ice Barrier, the temperature was much lower than expected for the season, making the surface much less suitable for the sledge runners. Furthermore, the tailwind which they had expected to aid them home did not appear. Scott wrote, in his final "Message to the Public": "...our wreck is certainly due to this sudden advent of severe weather...."
 The complexity of the transportation plan made it vulnerable. It depended in part on motor-sledges, ponies, dogs, and southerly winds to assist the sledges (which were fitted with sails). Half of the distance was intended to be covered by man-hauling (and sails whenever conditions permitted). Scott's daily marches were limited to the endurance of the slowest team, the man-haulers who were instructed to advance 15 miles a day. The ponies marched by night and rested when the sun was warmer, Meares remained idle in camp with the much faster dogs for many hours, before catching up at the end of the day. 
Sullivan states that it was the last factor that probably was decisive. He states:

Objectives of the expeditions 
Scott and his financial backers saw the expedition as having a scientific basis, while also wishing to reach the pole. However, it was recognised by all involved that the South Pole was the primary objective ("The Southern Journey involves the most important object of the Expedition" – Scott), and had priority in terms of resources, such as the best ponies and all the dogs and motor sledges as well as involvement of the vast majority of the expedition personnel. Scott and his team knew the expedition would be judged on his attainment of the pole ("The ... public will gauge the result of the scientific work of the expedition largely in accordance with the success or failure of the main object" – Scott). He was prepared to make a second attempt the following year (1912–13) if this attempt failed and had Indian Army mules and additional dogs delivered in anticipation. In fact the mules were used by the team that discovered the dead bodies of Scott, Henry Robertson Bowers, and Edward Adrian Wilson in November 1912, but proved even less useful than the ponies, according to Cherry-Garrard.

Amundsen's expedition was planned to reach the South Pole. This was a plan he conceived in 1909. Amundsen's expedition did conduct geographical work under Kristian Prestrud who conducted an expedition to King Edward VII Land while Amundsen was undertaking his attempt at the pole.

Base camps 
Amundsen had deduced that, as the Trans-Antarctic Mountains ran northwest to southeast then if he were to meet a mountain range on his route then the time spent at the high altitude of the Antarctic plateau would be less than Scott's.
Scott's base was at Cape Evans on Ross Island, with access to the Trans-Antarctic mountain range to the west, and was a better base for geological exploration. He had based his previous expedition in the same area. However, he knew it to be poor as a route to the pole as he had to start before sea ice melted and had suffered delay in returning while waiting for the sea ice to freeze. They also had to make detours around Ross Island and its known crevassed areas which meant a longer journey. The crossing of the Ross Ice Shelf was an onerous task for the ponies. Scott had advanced considerable stores across the ice shelf the year before to allow the ponies to carry lighter loads over the early passage across the ice. Even so, he had to delay the departure of the ponies until 1 November rather than 24 October when the dogs and motor sledges set off.
Consequently, the Motor Party spent 6 days at the Mount Hooper Depot waiting for Scott to arrive.

Methods of transport

Motor sledges 

The major comparison between Scott and Amundsen has focused on the choice of draft transport—dog versus pony/man-hauling. In fact Scott took dogs, ponies and three "motor sledges". Scott spent nearly seven times the amount of money on his motor sledges than on the dogs and horses combined. They were therefore a vital part of the expedition. Unfortunately, Scott decided to leave behind the engineer, Lieutenant Commander Reginald William Skelton who had created and trialled the motor sledges. This was due to the selection of Lieutenant E.R.G.R. "Teddy" Evans as the expedition's second in command. As Evans was junior in rank to Skelton, he insisted that Skelton could not come on the expedition. Scott agreed to this request, causing Skelton's experience and knowledge to be lost. One of the original three motor sledges was a failure even before the expedition set out; the heavy sledge was lost through thin ice on unloading it from the ship. The two remaining motor sledges failed relatively early in the main expedition because of repeated faults. Skelton's experience might have been valuable in overcoming the failures.

Ponies vs dogs 
[[File:Sled dogs - Terra Nova Expedition.jpg|thumb|Terra Nova'''s sled dogs.]]

Scott had used dogs on his first (Discovery) expedition and felt they had failed. On that journey, Scott, Shackleton, and Wilson started with three sledges and 13 dogs. But on that expedition, the men had not properly understood how to travel on snow with the use of dogs. The party had skis but were too inexperienced to make good use of them. As a result, the dogs travelled so fast that the men could not keep up with them. The Discovery expedition had to increase their loads to slow the dogs down. Additionally, the dogs were fed Norwegian dried fish, which did not agree with them and soon they began to deteriorate. The whole team of dogs eventually died (and were eaten), and the men took over hauling the sleds.

Scott's opinion was reinforced by Shackleton's experience on the Nimrod expedition, which got to within  of the pole. Shackleton used ponies. Scott planned to use ponies only to the base of the Beardmore Glacier (one-quarter of the total journey) and man-haul the rest of the journey. Scott's team had developed snow shoes for his ponies, and trials showed they could significantly increase daily progress. However, Lawrence Oates, whom Scott had made responsible for the ponies, was reluctant to use the snow shoes and Scott failed to insist on their use.

There was plenty of evidence that dogs could succeed in the achievements of William Speirs Bruce in his Arctic, Antarctic, and Scottish National Antarctic Expedition, Amundsen in the Gjøa North West passage expedition, Fridtjof Nansen's attempt at the North Pole, Robert Peary's three attempts at the North Pole, Eivind Astrup's work supporting Peary, Frederick Cook's discredited North Pole expedition, and Otto Sverdrup's explorations of Ellesmere Island. Moreover, Scott ignored the direct advice he received (while attending trials of the motor sledges in Norway) from Nansen, the most famous explorer of the day, who told Scott to take "dogs, dogs and more dogs".

At the time of the events, the expert view in England had been that dogs were of dubious value as a means of Antarctic transport. Broadly speaking, Scott saw two ways in which dogs may be used—they may be taken with the idea of bringing them all back safe and sound, or they may be treated as pawns in the game, from which the best value is to be got regardless of their lives. He stated that if, and only if, the comparison was made with a dog sledge journey which aimed to preserve the dogs' lives, 'I am inclined to state my belief that in the polar regions properly organised parties of men will perform as extended journeys as teams of dogs.' On the other hand, if the lives of the dogs were to be sacrificed, then 'the dog-team is invested with a capacity for work which is beyond the emulation of men. To appreciate this is a matter of simple arithmetic'. But efficiency notwithstanding, he expressed "reluctance" to use dogs in this way: "One cannot calmly contemplate the murder of animals which possess such intelligence and individuality, which have frequently such endearing qualities, and which very possibly one has learnt to regard as friends and companions."

Amundsen, by contrast, took an entirely utilitarian approach. Amundsen planned from the start to have weaker animals killed to feed the other animals and the men themselves. He expressed the opinion that it was less cruel to feed and work dogs correctly before shooting them, than it would be to starve and overwork them to the point of collapse. Amundsen and his team had similar affection for their dogs as those expressed above by the English, but they "also had agreed to shrink from nothing in order to achieve our goal". The British thought such a procedure was distasteful, though they were willing to eat their ponies.

Amundsen had used the opportunity of learning from the Inuit while on his Gjøa North West passage expedition of 1905. He recruited experienced dog drivers. To make the most of the dogs he paced them and deliberately kept daily mileages shorter than he need have for 75 percent of the journey, and his team spent up to 16 hours a day resting. His dogs could eat seals and penguins hunted in the Antarctic while Scott's pony fodder had to be brought all the way from England in their ship. It has been later shown that seal meat with the blubber attached is the ideal food for a sledge dog. Amundsen went with 52 dogs, and came back with 11.

What Scott did not realise is a sledge dog, if it is to do the same work as a man, will require the same amount of food. Furthermore, when sledge dogs are given insufficient food they become difficult to handle. The advantage of the sledge dog is its greater mobility. Not only were the Norwegians accustomed to skiing, which enabled them to keep up with their dogs, but they also understood how to feed them and not overwork them.

 Walking vs skiing on snow 

Scott took the Norwegian pilot and skier Tryggve Gran to the Antarctic on the recommendation of Nansen to train his expedition to ski, but although a few of his party began to learn, he made no arrangements for compulsory training for the full party. Gran (possibly because he was Norwegian) was not included in the South Pole party, which could have made a difference. Gran was, one year later, the first to locate the deceased Scott and his remaining companions in their tent just some 18 km (11 miles) short of One Ton depot, that might have saved their lives had they reached it.

Scott would subsequently complain in his diary, while well into his journey and therefore too late to take any corrective action and after over 10 years since the Discovery expedition, that "Skis are the thing, and here are my tiresome fellow countrymen too prejudiced to have prepared themselves for the event".

Amundsen, on his side, recruited a team of well experienced skiers, all Norwegians who had skied from an early age. He also recruited a champion skier, Olav Bjaaland, as the front runner. The Amundsen party gained weight on their return travel from the South Pole.

 Weather conditions 
Scott and Shackleton's experience in 1903 and 1907 gave them first-hand experience of average conditions in Antarctica. Simpson, Scott's meteorologist 1910–1912, charted the weather during their expedition, often taking two readings a day. On their return to the Ross Ice Shelf, Scott's group experienced prolonged low temperatures from 27 February until 10 March which have only been matched once in 15 years of current records. The exceptional severity of the weather meant they failed to make the daily distances they needed to get to the next depot. This was a serious position as they were short of fuel and food.

Scott also blamed "a prolonged blizzard". But while there is evidence to support the low temperatures, there is only evidence for a "normal" two- to four-day blizzard, and not the ten days that Scott claims.

 Route marking and depot laying 

During depot laying in February 1911, Roald Amundsen had his first (and last)  of his route marked like a Norwegian ski course using marker flags initially every . He added to this by using food containers painted black, resulting in a marker every mile. From 82 degrees on, Amundsen built a  cairn every three miles with a note inside recording the cairn's position, the distance to the next depot, and direction to the next cairn. In order not to miss a depot considering the snow and great distances, Amundsen took precautions. Each depot laid out up to 85 degrees (laid out every degree of latitude) had a line of bamboo flags laid out transversely every half-mile for five miles on either side of the depot, ensuring that the returning party could locate the designated depot.

Scott relied on depots much less frequently laid out. For one distance where Amundsen laid seven depots, Scott laid only two. Routes were marked by the walls made at lunch and evening stops to protect the ponies. Depots had a single flag. As a result, Scott has much concern recorded in his diaries over route finding, and experienced close calls about finding depots. It is also clear that Scott's team did not travel on several days, because the swirling snow hid their three-month-old outward tracks. With better depot and route marking they would have been able to travel on more days with a following wind which would have filled the sail attached to their sledge, and so travel further, and might have reached safety.

 Food and fuel 

By the time they arrived at the pole, the health of Scott's team had significantly deteriorated, whereas Amundsen's team actually gained weight during the expedition. Although Scott's team managed to maintain the scheduled pace for most of the return leg, and hence was virtually always on full rations, their condition continued to worsen rapidly. (The only delay occurred when they were held for four days by a blizzard, and had to open their summit rations early as a consequence.)

Apsley Cherry-Garrard in his analysis of the expedition estimated that even under optimistic assumptions the summit rations contained only a little more than half the calories actually required for the man-hauling of sledges. A carefully planned 2006 re-enactment of both Amundsen's and Scott's travels, sponsored by the BBC, confirmed Cherry-Garrard's theory. The British team had to abort their tour due to the severe weight loss of all members. The experts hinted that Scott's reports of unusually bad surfaces and weather conditions might in part have been due to their exhausted state which made them feel the sledge weights and the chill more severely.

Scott's calculations for the supply requirements were based on a number of expeditions, both by members of his team (e.g., Wilson's trip with Cherry-Garrard and Bowers to the Emperor penguin colony which had each man on a different type of experimental ration), and by Shackleton. Apparently, Scott did not take the strain of prolonged man-hauling at high altitudes sufficiently into account.

Since the rations contained no B and C vitamins, the only source of these vitamins during the trek was from the slaughter of ponies or dogs. This made the men progressively malnourished, manifested most clearly in the form of scurvy.

Scott also had to fight with a shortage of fuel due to leakage from stored fuel cans which used leather washers. This was a phenomenon that had been noticed previously by other expeditions, but Scott took no measures to prevent it. Amundsen, in contrast, had learned the lesson and had his fuel cans soldered closed. A fuel depot he left on Betty's Knoll was found 50 years later still full.

Dehydration may also have been a factor. Amundsen's team had plenty of fuel due to better planning and soldered fuel cans. Scott had a shortage of fuel and was unable to melt as much water as Amundsen. At the same time Scott's team were more physically active in man-hauling the sledges.

 Clothing and goggles 

Explorer Ranulph Fiennes and others have asserted that Scott's team was appropriately dressed for man-hauling in their woolen and wind-proof clothing and that Amundsen's, because they were skiing, was appropriately dressed in Inuit-style fur garments. Skiing at the pace of a dog team is a strenuous activity, yet Amundsen never complained about the clothing being too hot. That is because the furs are worn loosely so air circulates and sweat evaporates. Scott's team, on the other hand, made regular complaints about the cold.

Amundsen's team did initially have problems with their boots. However, the depot-laying trips of January and February 1911 and an abortive departure to the South Pole on 8 September 1911 allowed changes to be made before it was too late.

Scott's team suffered regularly from snow blindness, which sometimes affected over half the team at any one time. By contrast, there was no recorded case of snow blindness during the whole of Amundsen's expedition. On the return journey, Amundsen's team rested during the "day" (when the sun was in front of them) and travelled during the "night" (when the sun was behind them) to minimise the effects of snow blindness.

 Delay in meeting Scott's returning party 
In 1921, 'Teddy' Evans wrote in his book South with Scott that Scott had left the following written orders at Cape Evans.

He did however place a lesser importance upon this journey than that of replenishing the food rations at One Ton Depot.

He continued his instructions in the next paragraph "You will of course understand that whilst the object of your third journey is important, that of the second is vital. At all hazards three X.S. units of provision must be got to One Ton Camp by the date named (19th January), and if the dogs are unable to perform this task, a man party must be organised." with that qualification he closed his notes regarding his instructions for the dogs.

Expedition member Apsley Cherry-Garrard did not mention Scott's order in his 1922 book The Worst Journey in the World''. However, in the 1948 preface to his book, he discusses Scott's order. Cherry-Garrard writes that he and Edward Atkinson reached Cape Evans on 28 January. Scott had estimated Atkinson would reach camp by 13 January. Atkinson, now the senior officer discovered that the dog handler Cecil Meares had resigned from the expedition and that neither Meares nor anyone else had resupplied dog food to the depots. Cherry-Garrard also wrote "In my opinion he [Atkinson] would not have been fit to take out the dogs in the first week of February".

On 13 February, Atkinson set off on the first lap southwards to Hut Point with the dog assistant, Dimitri Gerov, and the dogs to avoid being cut off by disintegrating sea ice. Atkinson decided that this mission was his priority, and set out with the dogs to bring Evans back. This was achieved; the party was back at Hut Point on 22 February.

Atkinson sent a note back to the Cape Evans base camp requesting either the meteorologist Wright or Cherry-Garrard to take over the task of meeting Scott with the dogs. Chief meteorologist Simpson was unwilling to release Wright from his scientific work, and Atkinson therefore selected Apsley Cherry-Garrard. It was still not in Atkinson's mind that Cherry-Garrard's was a relief mission, and according to Cherry-Garrard's account, told him to "use his judgement" as to what to do in the event of not meeting the polar party by One Ton, and that Scott's orders were that the dogs must not be risked. Cherry-Garrard left with Gerov and the dogs on 26 February, carrying extra rations for the polar party to be added to the depot and 24 days' of dog food. They arrived at One Ton Depot on 4 March and did not proceed further south. Instead, he and Gerov, after waiting there for Scott for several days, apparently mostly in blizzard conditions (although no blizzard was recorded by Scott some 100 miles further south until 10 March), they returned to Hut Point on 16 March, in poor physical condition and without news of the polar party.

On the return journey from the pole, Scott reached the 82.30°S meeting point for the dog teams three days ahead of schedule, around 27 February 1912. Scott's diary for that day notes "We are naturally always discussing possibility of meeting dogs, where and when, etc. It is a critical position. We may find ourselves in safety at the next depot, but there is a horrid element of doubt." By 10 March it became clear that the dog teams were not coming: "The dogs which would have been our salvation have evidently failed. Meares [the dog-driver] had a bad trip home I suppose. It's a miserable jumble."

Around 25 March, awaiting death in his tent at latitude 79.40°S, Scott speculated, in a farewell letter to his expedition treasurer Sir Edgar Speyer, that he had overshot the meeting point with the dog relief teams, writing "We very nearly came through, and it's a pity to have missed it, but lately I have felt that we have overshot our mark. No-one is to blame and I hope no attempt will be made to suggest that we had lacked support."

Other reasons for Scott's failure

Geology samples
Scott's team continued to haul over 14 kg (30 lb) of rock samples. This would appear to be a major handicap when pulling a sledge in a race against the weather and a shortage of food and fuel. Scott could have left the samples at one of the cairns along the way to be picked up later. However, Ranulph Fiennes has suggested that the extra weight would not have been a major handicap. Tryggve Gran on the other hand thought "they might have saved themselves the bother".

Final five-man team
Scott's planning, equipment and rations had been based on three sledge teams of four men ascending the Beardmore, with a team turning back every 10 days or so as rations required finally leaving one four-man team to attempt the pole. At the last moment when down to two teams (Scott's and Evans's) Scott decided to send a returning party of three, and take on five. This increased the cooking time for the team of five and affected the fuel supply. It also meant the Evans party of three had to try to split the ration pack (at a time when they were cold and tired and later when one member was suffering from scurvy) to leave an allowance for the fifth man in Scott's party. This also will have affected the seepage of fuel from cans which were opened and then re-closed and left for several weeks before Scott's team got to them. Moreover, for some unexplained reason Scott had ordered Evans's team to cache their skis a week before, so Bowers (the fifth man) walked to the pole and back to the cached skis (360 miles) while the rest of Scott's team skied.

Misuse of the dog team
For no clear reason Scott took the dogs on 140 miles further than originally planned. This meant killing the ponies early (and starting man-hauling earlier) to feed the dogs for no obvious benefit to the overall expedition. Scott also gave conflicting and changing orders for their use to each returning party. It was only in late February 1912 that it was discovered that the final supplies needed by Scott's returning party had not been delivered to One Ton Depot. Cherry-Garrard was sent with these supplies on 25 February 1912 and he was relieved to discover that he had beaten Scott's team to the depot. He also found that promised supplies of dog food were not in place. Cherry-Garrard remained at the depot, within  of Scott, 4–10 March 1912 when he could possibly have saved Scott, Wilson, Bowers, and Oates if the management of the dog team had been better.

Navigation

Amundsen used prepared navigation sheets that simplified the calculations for his team when they were tired and cold. Four out of his team of five were qualified navigators. Amundsen's expedition also used a sextant during the journey, which is a relatively light and simple piece of equipment. He also attended a symposium that reviewed how to fix position at high latitudes. Scott used a theodolite which is heavier and requires more mental arithmetic. Scott also lacked navigators having only one per team. Scott dismissed Cherry-Garrard's request for navigational training and Wilson only attempted to learn how to read latitudes at the last moment.

Camp routine
Amundsen used canisters that left his sledges permanently lashed and loaded. Scott's team had to unload, and load and relash their sledge at every camp, no matter what the weather.

Timelines of Amundsen and Scott expeditions

References 

Amundsen's South Pole expedition
Amundsen and Scott expeditions
Antarctic expeditions
Heroic Age of Antarctic Exploration
Norway and the Antarctic
Robert Falcon Scott
Terra Nova expedition
United Kingdom and the Antarctic